Alejandra Orozco Loza (born 19 April 1997 in Zapopan, Mexico) is a Mexican diver. In 2012, she participated in the 2012 Summer Olympics in the synchronized 10 metre platform event alongside world champion Paola Espinosa, winning a silver medal. At the age of 15, she became the youngest athlete to represent Mexico at the 2012 Olympic games.

In 2021 she participated in the 2020 Summer Olympics in the synchronized 10 metre platform event alongside Gabriela Agúndez, winning a bronze medal.

References

Notes

Sources
 dive meets

External links
 
 
 Alejandra Orozco Loza at the 2019 Pan American Games

1997 births
Living people
Mexican female divers
Olympic divers of Mexico
Olympic silver medalists for Mexico
Olympic medalists in diving
Divers at the 2012 Summer Olympics
Divers at the 2016 Summer Olympics
Medalists at the 2012 Summer Olympics
Youth Olympic gold medalists for Mexico
Divers at the 2014 Summer Youth Olympics
Pan American Games medalists in diving
Pan American Games bronze medalists for Mexico
Divers at the 2015 Pan American Games
Divers at the 2019 Pan American Games
Medalists at the 2015 Pan American Games
Medalists at the 2019 Pan American Games
Sportspeople from Guadalajara, Jalisco
Medalists at the 2020 Summer Olympics
Olympic bronze medalists for Mexico
Divers at the 2020 Summer Olympics
People from Zapopan, Jalisco
Sportspeople from Jalisco
21st-century Mexican women